Shady Satin Drug is the second and final studio album by Canadian pop group soulDecision, released on October 26, 2004. The album was their second release after departing with their former company (Universal). The album's first single of the album was "Cadillac Dress". The single was never released as an official disc single. It was available to be downloaded from the band's official site. A video was shot for that song. The album sold about 10,000 copies when released. It was backed by a minor tour and a third and final single "Hypnotize". The album cost $5.4 million to produce, record, and promote. In return, Sextant filed for bankruptcy.

Track listing
"Cadillac Dress"
"Shady Satin Drug"
"Hypnotize"
"So Strong"
"Light It Up"
"Don't Dance Close to Me"
"It Must Be You"
"Sucky Love Song"
"Kiss the Walls"
"Ain't No Way to Make a Livin'"

Singles
"Cadillac Dress"
"Kiss the Walls"
"Hypnotize"

Personnel
Trevor Guthrie – vocals, guitar
Ken Lewko – keyboards
Terepai Richmond – drums
Tino Zulfo– bass guitar

Production work
Mastering – Brian Gardner
Producer – Nile Rodgers (tracks 1 –3, 6, 7), Trevor Guthrie (tracks 1–3, 5–10), Ken Lewko (track 4), soulDecision (tracks 1–7, 9, 10)
Producer, mixer, programming –  Peter Mokran

References

External links
 Shady Satin Drug Review

2004 albums
SoulDecision albums
Albums produced by Nile Rodgers